Christ's Dominion Academy is a private classical Christian school in Summerville, Pennsylvania, USA, and is affiliated with Living Church International. It offers kindergarten through 12th grade.

The school was started in 2001 with six students and currently has an enrollment of 18 for the 2021–2020 academic year.

References

Christian schools in Pennsylvania
Classical Christian schools
Private high schools in Pennsylvania
Private middle schools in Pennsylvania
Private elementary schools in Pennsylvania
Educational institutions established in 2001
2001 establishments in Pennsylvania